Porter Adventist Hospital is a 368-bed acute care hospital located in the University of Denver/Harvard Park area of Denver, Colorado.

In 2009, Porter Adventist was recognized as achieving quality care, nursing excellence and innovations in professional nursing practice by the American Nurses Credentialing Center. The hospital also was ranked No. 1 in Colorado (and in the top 10 percent nationally) for overall cardiac care, cardiology services and coronary interventional procedures by HealthGrades, the leading national independent healthcare ratings organization.

History 

In the early 1930s, Denver businessman Henry Porter fell ill while traveling in California. His treatment at two Seventh-day Adventist sanitoriums inspired him to build a hospital in Denver that embraced the Seventh-day Adventist philosophy of caring for the whole person. In 1930, he donated land and money to build Porter Adventist Hospital.

The original hospital opened just months into the Great Depression. From the 1940s through the 1960s, the hospital built south, east and west additions. In 1959, the hospital auxiliary was established; it is now the Porter Volunteer Association.

In 1996, Porter joined Catholic Health Initiatives, which has a joint venture between the Sisters of Charity of Cincinnati and the Sisters of St. Francis, to form Centura Health, Colorado's largest hospital and health care network delivering advanced care to more than half a million people each year, across 12 hospitals, seven senior living communities, medical clinics, Flight for Life and home care and hospice services. Porter continues to be owned & sponsored by Advent Health, the largest not-for-profit Protestant healthcare provider in the nation.

On December 11, 2014, Porter Adventist Hospital became a Level 3 trauma center.

Expansion 
In 2007, Porter completed a $110 million expansion and renovation project that added  to the hospital.

The expansion added a new emergency department. In addition, Porter added 15 operating rooms and 36 intensive care beds, combining cardiac and surgical units.

A new entrance and lobby were unveiled. Finally, the renovation included a new parking garage with more than 640 new spaces.

In 2009, Porter opened a four-bed cardiac short-stay unit for low-risk cardiac patients. In 2011, Porter opened the Porter Robotics Institute.

See also

 List of Seventh-day Adventist hospitals

External links

References 

Hospital buildings completed in 1931
Buildings and structures in Denver
Hospitals in Colorado
1930 establishments in Colorado
Hospitals established in 1930
AdventHealth